This article is about the demographic features of the population of the historical territory of Latvia, including population density, ethnic background, education level, health of the populace, economic status, religious affiliations and other aspects of the population.

History
Latvia was settled by the Baltic tribes some three millennia ago. The territories along the eastern Baltic first came under foreign domination at the beginning of the 13th century, with the formal establishment of Riga in 1201 under the German Teutonic Knights.

Latvia, in whole or in parts, remained under foreign rule for the next eight centuries, finding itself at the cross-roads of all the regional superpowers of their day, including Denmark (the Danes held on lands around the Gulf of Riga), Sweden, and Russia, with southern (Courland) Latvia being at one time a vassal to Poland-Lithuania as well as Latgale falling directly under Poland-Lithuania rule. Through all this time, Latvia remained largely under Baltic German hegemony, with Baltic Germans comprising the largest land-owners, a situation which did not change until Latvia's independence.

Historically, Latvia has had significant German, Russian, Jewish, Polish, Belarusian and Lithuanian minorities. The majority (roughly two thirds) of Latvians, under Swedish influences, adopted Lutheranism, while the minority (the remaining third) of Latvians under Poland-Lithuania, Latgale in particular, retained their Catholicism. Aglona, in Latgale, has been the site of annual Catholic pilgrimage for centuries, even through to today.

Recently introduced immigration law in Latvia provides framework for immigration through investment in various financial areas or real estate. In 2012, solely 2,435 applications for residence permit by investment in real estate were received by Office of Citizenship and Migration Affairs. Main immigrant countries are Russia, Belarus, Ukraine and Lithuania (Lithuania is in the European Union, thus no investment is needed). Moreover, Latvia receives residence permit applications from people of nationalities such as Afghans, Chinese, Libyans and people from various other distant countries.

Over 130,000 persons have been naturalized as Latvian citizens since 1995, but 182,375 persons, as of 2022, live in Latvia with non-citizen's passports. Large numbers of Russians, as well as some Ukrainians and Belarusians remained in Latvia after the fall of the Soviet Union.

According to the provisional results of the Population and Housing Census 2011, the total population of Latvia on 1 March 2011 was 2,067,887. Since the previous census in 2000 the country's population decreased by 309,000 or 13%. Based on the Population and Housing Census 2021, the total population of Latvia on 1 January 2021 was 1,893,223. Since the previous census in 2011 the country's population decreased by 174,664 or 8,5%. The proportion of ethnic Latvians increased to 62.7% of the population. Livonians are the other indigenous ethnic group, with about 250 of them remaining. Latgalians are a distinctive subgroup of Latvians inhabiting or coming from Eastern Latvia.

According to rankings provided by the United States Census Bureau—International Data Base (IDB)—Country Rankings, Latvia is estimated to have a population of 1,249,812 in the year 2050.

Population

Age structure

Vital statistics

Source: Central Statistical Bureau of Latvia

Current vital statistics

Immigration 
Illegal immigration in Latvia has traditionally been from neighboring countries but now migrants also come from other areas such as Latin America, Southeast Asia and Africa. The Latvian government have sought to work with Russia to stem the problem. In 2009 the US State Department criticized Latvia for its treatment of illegal immigrants.

For an immigrant not to become an illegal resident, a permit is required for a foreign national or a stateless person wishing to reside in the Republic of Latvia for more than 90 days within a 6-month period, thus if the person does not acquire himself a residence permit, he will be considered an illegal immigrant.

Ethnic groups
Latvia's indigenous population has been ravaged numerous times throughout history. The earliest such event occurred during the conquest of Latvia by Peter the Great in the Great Northern War with Sweden.

In 1897, the first official census in this area indicated that Latvians formed 68.3% of the total population of 1.93 million; Russians accounted for 12%, Jews for 7.4%, Germans for 6.2%, and Poles for 3.4%. The remainder were Lithuanians, Estonians, Gypsies, and various other nationalities.

The demographics shifted greatly in the 20th century due to the world wars, the expulsion of the Baltic Germans, the Holocaust, and occupation by the Soviet Union. Today, only the Russian minority, which has tripled in numbers since 1935, remains important. The share of ethnic Latvians fell from 75% (1,472,612) in 1935 to 52% (1,387,757) in 1989, after human loss in World War II and human deportation and other repressive measures.

In 2005, there were even fewer Latvians than in 1989, though their share of the population was larger 1,357,099 (58.8% of the inhabitants). People who arrived in Latvia during the Soviet era, and their descendants born before 21 August 1991, have to pass a naturalization process to receive Latvian citizenship. Their children born after the restoration of independence in 1991 are registered as citizens, if one of the parents requests it.

Ethnic Latvians have been one of the world's slowest-growing ethnic groups for a century. The number of Latvians today is actually less than it was in the 1920s.

Latvians have always been the largest ethnic group in Latvia during the past century, but minority peoples have always been numerous. Never in late modern history have they accounted for more than 80% of the population in Latvia. Before World War 2, the proportion of non-Latvians was approximately 25%, the Russians being the largest minority (approx. 10%), followed by Jews (approx. 5%), Germans and Poles (2–3%). After World War 2 only small numbers of Jews and Germans remained and following mass colonization of Russians, Latvians almost became a minority. There were also settlers from Belarus and Ukraine. In 1989, the proportion of Latvians had decreased to only 52% (from 75.5% in 1935). Despite the decreasing number of Latvians due to low fertility rates, the proportion of Latvians has considerably increased during the past two decades and reached 62.1% in 2011 (slightly higher than the 62.0% in 1959). This is due to large scale emigration of Russians, Ukrainians and Belarusians. The number of these peoples almost halved between 1989 and 2011.

Languages

 official: Latvian
 considered indigenous in some legislation: Livonian, Latgalian
 other languages registered as main language spoken at home by at least 500 speakers in 2011 census (in declining order): Russian, Belarusian, Ukrainian, Lithuanian, Polish, Romani, Tatar, Yiddish and Hebrew, Estonian, German
 other languages widely spoken: English (46%)
 Latvian Sign Language (legally recognised and supported) and Russian Sign Language

In the 2011 census, 1,164,894 persons in Latvia reported Latvian as their main language spoken at home; 698,757 respondents listed Russian as their main language spoken at home, representing 37.2% of the total population, whereas Latvian was recorded as the main language spoken at home for 62.1%. Latvian was spoken as a second language by 20.8% of the population, and 43.7% spoke Russian as a second language. In total, 71% of ethnic Latvians said they could speak Russian, and 52% of Russians could speak Latvian in the 2000 census.

In August 2019, the Central Statistical Bureau published new data indicating that Latvian was the native language of 60.8% of Latvia's population per 1 January 2018, a 2.6% increase compared to the 2000 census. 62.2% of the population was 'ethnically Latvian'. The percentage of native Latvian speakers increased in all statistical regions, especially in the Rīga capital region and Pierīga region around it (4.6%). The number of native Russian speakers dropped in all regions; in Latgale, the number of native Russian speakers also dropped, although their percentage remained the same at 55.5%, the highest of the country. Compared to the 2011 census, the share of people speaking Latvian at home rose by 1.9%, while the number of Russian home speakers dropped by 2.6%. 90.7% of ethnic Russians indicated they spoke Russian at home, while 8.5% of them indicated they spoke Latvian at home. Inter-linguistic marriage was an important factor why, for example, some non-native Latvian speakers who married native Latvian speakers switched to speaking Latvian at home. The percentage of Russian home speakers gradually increased with age from 30.0% amongst 0–4-year-olds to 44.2% amongst 55–64-year-olds, while Latvian home speakers gradually decreased with age from 69.2% amongst 0–4-year-olds to 55.0% amongst 55–64-year-olds, indicating that children in Latvia are increasingly being raised and educated in Latvian.

Religion

The largest religion in Latvia is Christianity (79%), though only about 7% of the population attends religious services regularly. The largest groups  were:
 Evangelical Lutheran Church of Latvia – 708,773
 Roman Catholic – 500,000
 Russian Orthodox – 370,000

In the Eurobarometer Poll 2010, 38% of Latvian citizens responded that "they believe there is a God", while 48% answered that "they believe there is some sort of spirit or life force" and 11% stated that "they do not believe there is any sort of spirit, God, or life force".

Lutheranism was more prominent before the Soviet occupation, when it was a majority religion of ~60% due to strong historical links with the Nordic countries and influence of the Hansa, and Germany in general. Since then, Lutheranism has declined to a slightly greater extent than Roman Catholicism in all three Baltic states. The Evangelical Lutheran Church, with an estimated 600,000 members in 1956, was affected most adversely. An internal document of 18 March 1987, near the end of communist rule, spoke of an active membership that had shrunk to only 25,000 in Latvia, but the faith has since experienced a revival. Moreover, modern Evangelical Protestant denominations are spreading worldwide, including Latvia. The country's Orthodox Christians belong to the Latvian Orthodox Church, a semi-autonomous body within the Russian Orthodox Church. In 2011, there were 416 Jews and 319 Muslims living in Latvia.

There are more than 600 Latvian neopagans, Dievturi, whose religion is based on Latvian mythology. About 21% of the total population is not affiliated with a specific religion.

See also
 Aging of Europe
 List of cities in the Baltic states by population

References

External links

 Naturalization Board of the Republic of Latvia: Figures and facts
 Office of Citizenship and Migration Affairs: Statistics 

 
Society of Latvia